The Bernina Pass (el. .) is a high mountain pass in the Bernina Range of the Alps, in the canton of Graubünden (Grisons) in eastern Switzerland. It connects the famous resort town of St. Moritz in the Engadin valley with the Italian-speaking Val Poschiavo, which ends in the Italian town of Tirano in Valtellina. The pass lies a few kilometres east of Piz Bernina, and south of Val Minor.

The Bernina Pass is crossed by both the Hauptstrasse 29 road and the Bernina railway line, with a popular tourist train, the Bernina Express operating year-round between Chur and Tirano. The train crosses the pass west of the road at a slightly lower  (at Ospizio Bernina) – it is the highest adhesion railway route in Europe.

Lago Bianco, Lej Nair and Lej Pitschen are located on the pass.

History

The pass was an important trade route over the Alps during the Middle Ages. In 1410 several communities north and south of the pass agreed to work together to maintain the path. In 1512 the Three Leagues and their Swiss allies invaded the Valtellina region through the Bernina Pass. Around this time the route over the pass was described for the first time.

The building of the road began in 1842. Head of engineers was Rudolf Albertini (1821–1896) from Zuoz. Since this time the road has been widened several times. Since 1965 it has been open all year round, although there is snow during 8 months.

Climate

Gallery

See also

 List of highest paved roads in Europe
 List of mountain passes
 List of the highest Swiss passes

References

External links 
Swisstopo map of the pass
Pictures from the Bernina Pass Mountainbike Route
Profile on climbbybike.com

Mountain passes of Switzerland
Mountain passes of the Alps
Mountain passes of Graubünden
Bernina Range
Engadin
Rail mountain passes of Switzerland
Poschiavo